The Media Control charts are record charts compiled by Media Control on behalf of the German record industry. They include the "Single Top 100" and the "Album Top 100" chart. The chart week runs from Friday to Thursday, and the chart compilations are published on Tuesday for the record industry. The entire top 100 singles and top 100 albums are officially released the following Friday by Media Control. The charts are based on sales of physical singles and albums from retail outlets as well as permanent music downloads.

Number-one hits by week

Sources 
http://www.germancharts.de/

See also 
List of number-one hits (Germany)
List of number-one hits of 2010 (Germany)
List of German airplay number-one songs

References

Number-one hits
Germany
2011
2011